Fit for Flogging is a 1993 album by the Danish musical project Leæther Strip, released on Cleopatra Records. Together with Penetrate the Satanic Citizen it bundles most of Leæther Strip's releases prior to Solitary Confinement.

Track listing
 Antius
 Black Gold
 G.A.W.M.
 Steal!
 Go Fuck Your Ass Off!
 Law Of Jante
 Nosecandy
 Fit For Flogging
 Cast Away
 The Nature Of God
 Break My Back
 Khomeini

References

Leæther Strip compilation albums
1993 compilation albums
Cleopatra Records compilation albums